Guy Melamed (born September 12, 1979 in Haifa) is a retired Israeli soccer defender.

Melamed went to the United States to play college soccer at Boston College, and was a four-year starter for the Eagles. He was named All-Big East his last three years in school. However, his status as a senior international turned off many MLS teams, and he slipped to the fourth round of the 2005 MLS SuperDraft, where he was taken by the Colorado Rapids with the 43rd pick. Subsequently, Melamed became the first Israeli to play in MLS.

Melamed was released, by his request, in September 2005.  He had an unsuccessful trial with Dundee FC of the Scottish First Division in October 2005.

References

1979 births
Living people
Israeli Jews
Israeli footballers
Israel under-21 international footballers
Maccabi Haifa F.C. players
Hapoel Tzafririm Holon F.C. players
Boston College Eagles men's soccer players
Colorado Rapids players
Israeli expatriate footballers
Expatriate soccer players in the United States
Israeli expatriate sportspeople in the United States
Footballers from Haifa
Major League Soccer players
Colorado Rapids draft picks
Association football defenders